Kalochori is a village and a community of the Delta municipality. Before the 2011 local government reform it was part of the municipality of Echedoros, of which it was a municipal district. The 2011 census recorded 4,672 inhabitants in the village. The community of Kalochori covers an area of 32.127 km2.

History 
In February 2012, it was reported that many historical artifacts had been discovered during an excavation. In September 2016, New Zealanders built a shipping container library for refugees in the area.

See also
 List of settlements in the Thessaloniki regional unit

References

Populated places in Thessaloniki (regional unit)